Cristian Ariel Colmán Ortiz (born 26 February 1994) is a Paraguayan professional footballer who plays as a forward for Ecuadorian Serie A club Universidad Católica.

Career 
On January 26, 2017 Colmán signed as a young designated player for FC Dallas. On February 23, 2017 Colmán scored his first goal for FC Dallas in his first match against Árabe Unido in the first leg of the CONCACAF Champions League quarterfinals. His second goal came in the CONCACAF Champions League semifinal second leg in a loss against Pachuca.

Colmán was released by Dallas at the end of their 2019 season.

References

External links
 

1994 births
Living people
Paraguayan footballers
Paraguayan expatriate footballers
People from Itapúa Department
Association football forwards
Designated Players (MLS)
Major League Soccer players
Footballers at the 2015 Pan American Games
Pan American Games competitors for Paraguay
Club Atlético 3 de Febrero players
Club Nacional footballers
FC Dallas players
North Texas SC players
Barcelona S.C. footballers
Godoy Cruz Antonio Tomba footballers
Arsenal de Sarandí footballers
Barracas Central players
Paraguayan Primera División players
Argentine Primera División players
Ecuadorian Serie A players
USL League One players
Expatriate soccer players in the United States
Expatriate footballers in Ecuador
Expatriate footballers in Argentina
Paraguayan expatriate sportspeople in the United States
Paraguayan expatriate sportspeople in Ecuador
Paraguayan expatriate sportspeople in Argentina